Pseudostellaria is a genus of flowering plants in the family Caryophyllaceae. There are up to 20 species, most of which occur in Asia. They are similar to Stellaria, differing in the morphology of the roots and fruit capsules and having shallower notches in the petals.

Selected species
Pseudostellaria heterophylla - false starwort, hai er shen, tai zi shen
Pseudostellaria jamesiana - tuber starwort
Pseudostellaria oxyphylla
Pseudostellaria rupestris
Pseudostellaria sierrae - Sierra starwort

References

 
Caryophyllaceae genera